The Asan or Assan were a Yeniseian speaking people in Siberia.  In the 18th and 19th centuries they were assimilated by the Evenks.  They spoke the Assan language.

Sources
Wixman, Ronald. The Peoples of the USSR: An Ethnographic Handbook. (Armonk, New York: M. E. Sharpe, Inc, 1984) p. 14

Historical ethnic groups of Russia
Indigenous small-numbered peoples of the North, Siberia and the Far East
Ethnic groups in Siberia
Indigenous peoples of North Asia